Haux may refer to:

 Haux, Gironde, a commune in France
 Haux, Pyrénées-Atlantiques, a commune in France
 Villa Haux, a monument in Germany